A Lifetime or More is a split EP by The Album Leaf and On! Air! Library!. The first three tracks are by the former band, and the last five tracks by the latter band.

Track listing
The Album Leaf-Another Day
The Album Leaf-Essex
The Album Leaf-Lamplight
On! Air! Library!-Ex's and ho's oh's
On! Air! Library!-Pass the Mic (p)
On! Air! Library!-Pass the Mic (a)
On! Air! Library!-Pass the Mic (c)
On! Air! Library!-Faux Fromm

References

The Album Leaf albums
2003 EPs
On!Air!Library! albums
Split EPs
Arena Rock Recording Company EPs